Kang Tae-oh (born Kim Yoon-hwan on June 20, 1994) is a South Korean actor and singer. He was a member of the actor group 5urprise. He rose to international popularity for his starring role in the television series Extraordinary Attorney Woo (2022).

Career 
In 2013, Kang made his acting debut in the web series After School: Lucky or Not together with the members of 5urprise – actor group formed by talent agency Fantagio. He then played supporting roles in MBC weekend drama Flower of Queen in 2015. 

He also made his name in Vietnam by playing the lead role in the Korean-Vietnamese joint drama Forever Young.

In 2019, Kang joined the KBS historical drama The Tale of Nokdu, which earned him critical acclaim for acting in historical dramas. And in the same year, he made a special appearance in the MBC drama Love with Flaws playing the role of Oh Yeon-seo's ex-boyfriend, He later appeared in the Netflix original series My First First Love. 

In 2020, Kang appeared in the JTBC drama Run On where he played an art student alongside Choi Soo-young. Later that same year, his contract with the same agency expired and he moved to Man of Creation (M.O.C), an agency established by former agency managers. 

In 2021, Kang appeared in the drama Doom at Your Service and the one-act drama Drama Special - The Effect of One Night on Farewell.  

In 2022, Kang made a special appearance in the drama Thirty-Nine by appearing as a friend of Lee Tae-hwan. Later in the same year, he played one of the main characters in the drama Extraordinary Attorney Woo; his last drama appearance before his military service in September 2022.

Personal life

Military enlistment 
Kang was set to enlist in the military with the earliest tentative enlistment date being in August or September. He was reported to be serving as a regular active duty soldier.

On August 31, 2022, Kang announced at a fan meeting that he would enlist for his mandatory military service on September 20, 2022. He will conduct basic military training at the 37th Infantry Division Jeungpyeong-gun, Chungcheongbuk-do. After basic training, he will serve as an assistant training instructor with the same division.

Philanthropy 
On August 10, 2022, Kang donated  to help those affected by the 2022 South Korean floods through the Hope Bridge Korea Disaster Relief Association.

Filmography

Film

Television series

Web series

Television shows

Awards and nominations

References

External links
 on Fantagio 

1994 births
Living people
South Korean male television actors
South Korean male idols
South Korean male film actors
21st-century South Korean male actors
People from Incheon
Konkuk University alumni